Timashevsk, sometimes romanized Timashyovsk, is a town and the administrative center of Timashevsky District of Krasnodar Krai, Russia, located on the Kirpili River  north of Krasnodar, the administrative center of the krai. As of 2020, the city has a population of 50,792.

History
It was founded in 1794 and was granted town status in 1966.
On August 17, 1942, 21 Jews were shot in the sovkhoze "Timachevets". Seven other Jews were arrested in the hamlet Proletary and taken to there in order to be killed. According to the Extraordinary Soviet Commission, 75 Jews were shot in August 1942 in this location by an Einsatzgruppen.

Administrative and municipal status
Within the framework of administrative divisions, Timashevsk serves as the administrative center of Timashevsky District. As an administrative division, it is, together with one rural locality (the settlement of Kirpichny), incorporated within Timashevsky District as the Town of Timashevsk. As a municipal division, the Town of Timashevsk is incorporated within Timashevsky Municipal District as Timashevskoe Urban Settlement.

Twin towns and sister cities

Timashevsk is twinned with:
 Lethbridge, Alberta, Canada

Notable people
 

Aleksandr Khromykov (born 1984), Russian professional football coach and former player

References

Notes

Sources

Cities and towns in Krasnodar Krai
Holocaust locations in Russia